The Koyva is a river in Perm Krai in Russia, a right tributary of the Chusovaya (Kama's basin).
It starts on the western slope of the Ural Mountains, on the slopes of Mount Bolshaya Khmelikha. Its mouth is near the settlement Ust-Koyva,  from the mouth of the Chusovaya River. It is a mountain river with many rapids and shoals.

It was along the Koyva that the first ever diamonds were found in 1829 in Russia. There are urban-type settlement Tyoplaya Gora situated by the river.

Main tributaries:
Left: Tiskos, Tyrym, Olkhovka;
Right: Biser, Kusya.

Etymology 
Name of river is a composition of Komi-Permyak words ‘koy’ (splash) and ‘va’ (water).

References 

Koyva in Great Soviet Encyclopedia
Koyva in encyclopedia of Perm Krai

Rivers of Perm Krai